Mandelshtam is the remains of a large crater on the Moon's far side named after Leonid Mandelstam. Nearly attached to the northeast outer rim is the crater Papaleksi. To the south lies the crater Vening Meinesz.

The outer rim of this crater has been battered into near ruin, with sections forming only an irregular circular rise in the surface. Much of the rim consists of clefts, small craters, and ridges. The satellite crater Mandelshtam R breaks across the rim to the west-southwest, and Mandelshtam Y is attached to the northern edge.

The interior floor of the crater has not escaped bombardment, and the central portion is overlain by Mandelshtam A, a respectable crater in its own right. Mandelshtam N lies on the interior along the south-southwestern inner edge. The northwestern floor and to a lesser degree the southeast floor are relatively level, and have suffered less impact damage than elsewhere.

The small crater Mandelshtam F to the east has a small ray system with several faint, streaky rays overlaying the floor of Mandelshtam.

Satellite craters

By convention these features are identified on lunar maps by placing the letter on the side of the crater midpoint that is closest to Mandelshtam.

References

 
 
 
 
 
 
 
 
 
 
 
 

Impact craters on the Moon